The Pace Grasso Stadium, formerly known as Schreiber Sports Ground, was a stadium in Paola, Malta. It was used mostly for football matches.

History
The site of the stadium was formerly occupied by Tal-Borg Battery, an artillery battery built by Maltese insurgents during the French blockade of 1798–1800. The battery was probably demolished during the early 19th century.

The stadium was built in 1946 on land provided by the Governor of Malta of that time, Sir Edmond Schreiber. Fittingly, the stadium was named as Schreiber Sports Ground but eventually it was renamed to Pace Grasso Stadium in remembrance of Harry Grasso and Victor Pace, who were both killed by an explosion caused by fireworks intended to be used for Hibernians' post-FA Trophy celebrations. Hibernians had lost the match to Sliema Wanderers on penalties.

The stadium used to host matches from the lower divisions of the Maltese football league but eventually was replaced by the modern Centenary Stadium in Ta' Qali.

Future
The stadium, which has since fallen in state of disrepair, was subject to a number of proposed developments but finally on 28 September 2017, the Planning Authority approved the construction of a regional health hub in the area. The project also entails the conversion of part of the Pace Grasso Stadium into temporary parking.

Violence
On 14 May 1967, violence broke out and three matches had to be abandoned.

See also

List of football stadiums in Malta

References

Defunct football venues in Malta
Tarxien